Edith Roberts ( – August 20, 1935) was an American silent film actress from New York City.

Career
Born in New York City, Roberts was a child actress.

Roberts performed in vaudeville before she went to Hollywood in 1916. Among her more than 150 screen credits are roles in Seven Keys to Baldpate (1925), Big Brother (1923), The Wagon Master (1929), The Mystery Club (1926), and Two O'Clock in the Morning (1929). 

In 1927, Roberts spent four months in Australia and the Fiji Islands as a co-star of a film for Australasian Film Company, Ltd. She also starred in films for Universal. In 1920, she completed work on White Youth and signed a long-term contract with Universal.

Roberts's final film appearance was in The Adorable Savage (1933).

Personal life and death

Roberts was married to real estate operator Harold Carter. On August 20, 1935, she died shortly after giving birth to a son, Robert, at age 36. A Christian Science memorial service was conducted at the chapel at Hollywood Cemetery, Los Angeles, California.

Selected filmography

 When the Call Came (1915)
 Billy's College Job (1915)
 The Trail of the Wild Wolf (1916)
 Cinders (1916)
 Jilted in Jail (1917)
 The Brazen Beauty (1918)
 The Deciding Kiss (1918)
 Set Free (1918)
 Bill Henry (1919)
 Lasca (1919)
 White Youth (1920)
 Her Five-Foot Highness (1920)
 Alias Miss Dodd (1920)
 The Adorable Savage (1920)
 The Triflers (1920)
 The Fire Cat (1921)
 Thunder Island (1921)
 Opened Shutters (1921)
 The Unknown Wife (1921)
 Luring Lips (1921)
 Flesh and Blood (1922)
 Pawned (1922)
The Son of the Wolf (1922)
 Thorns and Orange Blossoms (1922)
 A Front Page Story (1922)
 Saturday Night (1922)
 The Sunshine Trail (1923)
 Backbone (1923)
 The Dangerous Age (1923)
 Roulette (1924)
 Twenty Dollars a Week (1924)
 The Bowery Bishop (1924)
 The Age of Innocence (1924)
 Thy Name Is Woman (1924)
 Roaring Rails (1924)
 Three Keys (1925)
 Heir-Loons (1925)
 Wasted Lives (1925)
 On Thin Ice (1925)
 The New Champion (1925)
 Shattered Lives (1925)
 Seven Keys to Baldpate (1925)
 There You Are! (1926)
 The Taxi Mystery (1926)
 The Jazz Girl (1926)
 The Mystery Club (1926)
 Shameful Behavior? (1926)
 The Adorable Outcast (1928)
 Dreary House (1928)
 The Man from Headquarters (1928)
 The Phantom of the North (1929)

References
 
Los Angeles Times, Last Honor Paid To Edith Roberts, August 23, 1935, Page A2.

External links

Edith Roberts at Virtual History

1890s births
1935 deaths
Actresses from New York City
American silent film actresses
Deaths from sepsis
Vaudeville performers
Deaths in childbirth
American Christian Scientists
Infectious disease deaths in California
20th-century American actresses